Rachid Benayen (born 13 February 1979 in Vaulx-en-Velin, Rhône) is a French-Algerian footballer. He currently plays as a forward for U.R. Namur in the Belgian Second Division.

References

External links
Rachid Benayen profile at chamoisfc79.fr

1979 births
Living people
People from Vaulx-en-Velin
French sportspeople of Algerian descent
Algerian footballers
French footballers
JS Kabylie players
FC Gueugnon players
FC Libourne players
Chamois Niortais F.C. players
FC Rouen players
Ligue 2 players
Lyon La Duchère players
Algeria under-23 international footballers
AS Moulins players
Association football forwards
Sportspeople from Lyon Metropolis
Footballers from Auvergne-Rhône-Alpes